Acacia albicorticata is a species of legume in the family Fabaceae.
It is found in Argentina and Bolivia.
It is threatened by habitat loss.

References
 Prado, D. 1998.  Acacia albicorticata.   2006 IUCN Red List of Threatened Species.   Downloaded on 18 July 2007.

albicorticata
Flora of Argentina
Flora of Bolivia
Vulnerable plants
Taxonomy articles created by Polbot